The 1900 Venezuelan earthquake (also known as the San Narciso earthquake (Español: 1900 terremoto de San Narciso)), occurred on October 28 at between 4:30 and 4:45 am local time. This earthquake had an epicenter off Miranda State or near the Venezuelan capital Caracas, in the Cariaco Basin. It had an estimated moment magnitude of 7.6–7.7 and a surface-wave magnitude of 7.7–8.4. It had a maximum Mercalli intensity assigned VIII–X, causing landslides and liquefaction events. Many buildings were severely damaged or collapsed during the earthquake. It is thought to be the last great earthquake of the 19th century and the largest instrumentally recorded in the republic, having been felt throughout.

Earthquake
The earthquake was associated with strike-slip faulting along either the La Tortuga or San Sebastián faults. These two faults are thought to be striking east–west off the northern Venezuelan coast. A recent study in 2015, concluded that the San Sebastián Fault was the structure responsible for this earthquake. The San Sebastián Fault is submarine for most of its length. Its onshore trace is parallel to the southern flanks of the Venezuelan Coastal Range. Older studies including one in 1984 assigned the San Sebastián Fault as the source after reassessing the earthquake intensity data. Audemard in 2002 used the idea of a seismic gap around the region where the earthquake struck. The rupture extent caused by the 1900 earthquake is located between that of the 1812 and 1853 earthquakes. Ocean-bottom surveys found young seafloor deformation and fault scarps which are evidence of the 1900 rupture. A rupture length of 220 km for an  7.6 and 270 km for a  7.7 with an average slip depth at 15 km has been suggested.

Magnitude
This earthquake is larger than the magnitude 7.5 1812 Caracas earthquake, but was far less destructive. With a magnitude of 7.7 on the surface wave and moment magnitude scales, it is the largest instrumentally recorded earthquake in Venezuela. The National Geophysical Data Center catalog lists this earthquake as having a surface wave magnitude of 8.4 while a 1983 catalog placed that figure at 7.7. Charles Francis Richter also assigned the earthquake at  8.4 in his 1958 book Elementary seismology. In a 1992 catalog and 2020 study, this event was assigned  7.6.

Aftershocks
More than 250 aftershocks were recorded in the months following the main event. The aftershocks were disruptive to the local population. An aftershock is claimed to have woken then President of Venezuela Cipriano Castro in the middle of the night. Frightened by the tremors, he leaped off one of the windows of the Yellow House and suffered a broken ankle.

Impact
With an epicenter in the Caribbean Sea, the earthquake badly affected the north-central Venezuelan coast. In the central region, the earthquake resulted in shaking as high as IX on the Modified Mercalli intensity scale, covering a 3,560 km2 region around the epicenter. The seaside cities of Macuto, Guarenas and Guatire were the most severely affected by the earthquake. The Los Roques archipelago in the Caribbean Sea suffered heavy impact, reportedly having the highest number of victims. Twenty-five people were killed in Guarenas.

Large landslides and liquefactions took place in Anzoátegui, Aragua, Carabobo, Distrito Capital, Miranda and Vargas. The heavily populated localities that were affected include Barcelona, Onoto and Carenero. Some slight damage was reported in San Antonio de Los Altos, Paparo, Panaquire, Guarenas, Capaya, La Tortuga Island, Los Roques archipelago, Güigüe, San Diego, Clarines, Puerto Cabello and Caucagua.

Iglesia de San Francisco, a church in Caracas, was severely damaged. Another church in Naiguatá was completely destroyed. In Macuto, landslides buried or destroyed railway lines serving the cities Caracas and La Guaira. Guatire saw 237 homes, a parish church, government house, and court offices damaged or collapsed. In Guarenas, some 72 homes toppled.

The total death toll from the earthquake is estimated to be over 140. At least 50 people were injured.

Effects on landscape and hydrological features
At a seaside port in Barcelona named El Rincón, built on alluvium deposits from the Neverí River, many large cracks opened in the ground. Some cracks were longer than 300 meters. A 400 m2 area of alluvium in the city subsided significantly due to lateral spreading as a result of ground failure. Field observations also noted that an opening of the Neverí River was narrowed by more than two meters, while its water level rose. The water level in a number of saline wells rose substantially by several meters and began sloshing violently.

Along the Unare River in Anzoátegui, portions of its bank slumped into the water. Large and deep fissures opened, ejecting mud and water. Seiches formed along the river, causing water to breach the channel by seven meters. A man was caught in the waves when he was taking a bath but managed to escape.

In Carenero, Miranda, the ground sprouted black water that smelled of sulfur. Liquefaction caused several homes and other buildings to sink partially.

Hot springs located near San Diego, Anzoátegui dired up some time after the earthquake.

Residents living around Lake Tacarigua also described violent seiches in the lake as well as loud noises compared to that of a sea. They added that large flames and fire shot out of the ground near the lake shores.

A 100-meter wide landslide buried and sealed off a section of the Caracas-La Guaira highway between Guaracarumbo and Ojo de Agua.

Tsunami
A tsunami flooded the low-lying near shore zones of northern Venezuela. Waves swept into the Los Roques archipelago and north-central Venezuelan coasts. It manifested in the form of tidal bores at the mouth of the Neverí River which resulted in the rise in water level. The tsunami is estimated to be 1–meter high. Witnesses at the coast at the mouth of the Guapo River in Puerto Tuy, Miranda reported seeing large waves up to 10 meters high, although this claim is disputed. Because the earthquake struck in complete darkness, before sunrise, it is unlikely the eyewitnesses could have a clear view of the wave. In addition, it is nearly impossible for them to survive being struck by the 10-meter tsunami. The small village of Paparo was partially submerged by the waves. A better estimate of the maximum tsunami wave height is 5 meters at Barlovento. The tsunami may have been generated by a submarine landslide or significant vertical slip mechanism associated with faulting.

Legacy
The earthquake of 1900 was a catalyst in expanding research in seismology in Venezuela due to its size and being one of the last great historical earthquakes at the time. The first seismic instruments were brought into the country in the aftermath of the earthquake and installed at the Cagigal Observatory in November 1900 to early 1901.

See also
List of earthquakes in 1900
List of earthquakes in Venezuela

References

External links

Earthquakes in Venezuela
1900 natural disasters
1900 in science
1900 in the environment
1900 in South America
1900 floods in South America
Tsunamis in Venezuela
1900 disasters in Venezuela